The 2008 Tennessee Volunteers football team represented the University of Tennessee in the 2008 NCAA Division I FBS football season. The team was led by head football coach Phillip Fulmer in his 16th and final season as head coach.  The Vols played their home games in Neyland Stadium and competed in the Eastern Division of the Southeastern Conference (SEC). The 2008 campaign followed a 10–4 2007 season, which saw the Vols win the Eastern Division of the conference and the Outback Bowl. This season marked the ten year anniversary of Tennessee's 1998 BCS National Championship. On November 3, Fulmer announced that, after winning some 150 games over his career, he would step down from coaching his alma mater at the end of the season.

Before the season

Recruiting
The Vols followed the previous year of a top 5 class, with an effort that found the team ranked outside of the top 25 by both major recruiting websites, Rivals.com and Scout.com.  The top players of the class were considered to be tight end Aaron Douglas out of Maryville, Tennessee and wide receiver/linebacker E.J. Abrams-Ward out of Thomasville, North Carolina.

Douglas played at Tennessee as a redshirt freshman 2009, transferred to Arizona Western College in the 2010 season and winter of 2010 signed with Alabama, where he participated in spring drills. 
Douglas was recruited to Tennessee as a tight end, and was moved to tackle by then first year coach Lane Kiffin. When Kiffin left Tennessee for USC, Douglas failed to report for spring drills under new coach Derek Dooley (American football)  and eventually transferred to Arizona Western.

Douglas redshirted his first season at Tennessee under then coach Phillip Fulmer, and a year later developed into an elite offensive lineman under Kiffin and line coach James Cregg. Douglas told the News Sentinel in May 2010 that a third coach in three years flipped the plan he had mapped out for himself “upside down.”

On Thursday, May 12, 2011 Police received a call at 8:13 a.m. Thursday and, upon investigation, they found Douglas' body on the second-floor balcony of a Fernandina Beach, Florida residence. Douglas was pronounced dead at the scene. Of what was characterized as an accidental drug overdose.

Abrams-Ward, a receiver redshirted for the 2008 season, selecting UT over North Carolina in a heated recruiting battle.
On January 22, 2009 UT announced that E.J. Abrams-Ward and Ramone Johnson where no longer members of Tennessee's football team. UT said that the two were dismissed from the team for disciplinary reasons.

Coaching changes

Tennessee lost 4 members of their offensive staff. Offensive Coordinator David Cutcliffe accepted the head coaching position at Duke. Cutcliffe took along OL/TE coach Matt Luke, and RB coach Kurt Roper. Roper joined the Blue Devils' staff as Offensive Coordinator. WR coach Trooper Taylor also left the Vols for a coordinator position, accepting a job as Co-Offensive Coordinator at Oklahoma State.

Cutcliffe was replaced by Dave Clawson, who comes to Tennessee from the University of Richmond, where he was the head coach. Joining Clawson from Richmond is Latrell Scott, who replaced Taylor as the wide receivers coach. Stan Drayton, formerly the running backs coach at Florida, was hired to replace Roper as the running backs coach. Jason Michael, formerly on the staff for the New York Jets, was hired to coach the tight ends, replacing Matt Luke.

Defensive coordinator John Chavis interviewed with the Atlanta Falcons but chose to stay at Tennessee. This decision followed a similar decision by defensive ends coach Steve Caldwell. In December 2007 Caldwell chose to stay with Tennessee and turned down an offer to be the Defensive Coordinator at Arkansas.

Player news
Tennessee was bolstered by the return of safety Demetrice Morley. Morley was a five star recruit out of Miami, Florida who played for the Vols in 2005 and 2006 before being dismissed from the football team and leaving school for academic reasons. After sitting out the 2007 season, Morley was readmitted to the University in January 2008 and will rejoin the team.  Morley told the media that he had been living in his car following his dismissal from the team, but that the birth of his son motivated him to return.

Another defensive back, Antonio Gaines, was awarded a sixth year of eligibility by the NCAA in February. Gaines had missed the majority of both the 2003 and 2007 seasons due to injuries.

The Vols are also welcoming two major transfer student athletes. Gerald Williams, who originally signed with Tennessee in 2005 has been cleared to join the team after spending finishing up at San Francisco Junior College. Brandon Warren, a Freshman All American at Florida State has been cleared to play by the NCAA.

Discipline
The Volunteer football team has also seen its share of off of the field issues since the close of the 2007 season. The first incident of the offseason occurred during a recruiting weekend. Wide receivers Gerald Jones and Ahmad Paige were cited for a misdemeanor possession of marijuana while hosting a recruit. Neither were suspended, but both were required to undertake more frequent drug testing and participate in a police ride along program.

Another incident involved redshirt freshman running back Daryl Vereen. Vereen was arrested and charged with public intoxication and underage consumption after an on campus fight.  Vereen was required to perform community service and was under a semester-long curfew. Fulmer also required the entire team to attend 6 A.M. running as punishment for the offense.

Offensive lineman Anthony Parker was arrested and charged with disorderly conduct in January. Parker's punishment included morning runs, curfew, community service and the police ride along program. Parker was charged after failing to obey the commands of a Knoxville police officer with whom he had previous run-ins.  This incident was followed by the arrest of incoming walk-on Vincent Faison for DUI. Faison was suspended for two games.

In February, linebacker Dorian Davis and defensive back Antonio Wardlow were dismissed from the team for a violation of team rules. The most recent incident of the offseason involved decorated punter Britton Colquitt. Colquitt was suspended for five games after being arrested and charge with both DUI and leaving the scene of an accident. Colquitt also had his scholarship revoked.

Schedule

Players

Starting lineups and coaches
Head coach: Phillip Fulmer

Offense
Offensive Coordinator / Quarterbacks: Dave ClawsonOffensive Scheme: Multiple

Wide Receivers: Latrell ScottOffensive Line: Greg AtkinsRunning Backs: Ronald Gallant Jr.Tight Ends: Jason Michael

Offensive outlook
CoachesHead Coach Phillip Fulmer hired Dave Clawson, formerly the head coach at the University of Richmond, to replace David Cutcliffe as offensive coordinator. Greg Atkins (offensive line) is the only returning coach on the offensive staff.  Joining him are newly hired assistants Stan Drayton (running backs), Jason Michael, and Latrell Scott (wide receivers).

QuarterbacksThe Vols must replace graduate Erik Ainge, a 5th-round selection of the New York Jets in the 2008 NFL Draft. The leading candidates are Jonathan Crompton, who started one game as an injury replacement for Ainge in 2006, redshirt freshman B. J. Coleman and redshirt sophomore Nick Stephens. After spring practices, Crompton had minor elbow surgery but should be ready for the season opener and all reports are that Crompton will be the starting quarterback.

Running backs Arian Foster saw the majority of time at tailback last season, with relief appearances by LaMarcus Coker, Montario Hardesty, and Lennon Creer.  Coker was eventually dismissed from the team following the South Carolina game for a violation of team rules. Foster finished the season with 1193 rushing yards and 12 TDs.  Foster, Hardesty and Creer all return and look to see significant time in the backfield. Looking to work his way into the rotation will be Daryl Vereen, a highly touted redshirt freshman. The fullback position may also be used more under Clawson. The starter was supposed to be David Holbert, but he has suffered another ACL injury and is out for the year. To honor Holbert, Arian Foster will wear Holbert's #30 jersey in the season opener at UCLA. With the injury to Holbert, sophomore Kevin Cooper looks to be the starter but true freshman Austin Johnson, who just recently moved from linebacker to fullback, will also compete for playing time.

ReceiversThe wide receivers were led by Lucas Taylor and Austin Rogers last season. Taylor had 73 receptions for 1,000 yards, while Rogers caught 56 passes for 624 yards.  Both return for their senior season in 2008. Joining them will be Senior Josh Briscoe, Junior Quintin Hancock, Sophomores Gerald Jones, who many said was the star of the spring and will also see time at quarterback, Denarius Moore, and redshirt freshman Ahmad Paige.

Offensive lineThe offensive line returns the entire starting group from late in the 2007 season. The line was shuffled after an injury to Eric Young. Josh McNeil will anchor the line at center, with guards Anthony Parker and Jacques McClendon. Ramon Foster and Chris Scott will be the starters at tackle. This line allowed only 4 sacks during the 2007 season. Many experts predict Anthony Parker to be a First team All-American and for this unit to be the strongest in the SEC.

Tight endsThe tight end position is up in the air following the losses of Chris Brown and Brad Cottam. Brad's brother Jeff Cottam and Luke Stocker are the leading candidates for the starting job. Because of the depth issues at tight end, offensive lineman Cody Pope was moved to play the position

Current starters (as of October 6, 2008)

 * – Denotes returning starter.
 ↑ – Denotes number of games started by the player at the listed position during the 2008 season.

Defense
Defensive coordinator / linebackers / associate head coach: John Chavis (20th year)
Base Defense: Multiple (4–3 and 3–2–6 "Mustang")

Defensive line: Dan Brooks
Defensive ends: Steve Caldwell
Defensive backs: Larry Slade

Position outlook

Coaches2008 will be the 14th season as defensive coordinator for John Chavis. The defensive staff had been together and unchanged since the 1999 season, with Dan Brooks, Steve Caldwell and Larry Slade.

Defensive lineOn the defensive line, the Vols must replace two starters at end. Senior Robert Ayers and Junior Wes Brown are the leading candidates at those two spots. Tackles Dan Williams and DeMonte Bolden return after starting for the majority of the 2007 season. Providing depth will be tackles Walter Fisher, Chase Nelson, Donald Langley and Victor Thomas along with ends Ben Martin, Andre Mathis, and Chris Walker.

LinebackersThe Vols replace two starters in the linebacker corps. Junior Rico McCoy returns to man one of the outside spots. Ellix Wilson, who started the 2008 Outback Bowl at the middle linebacker looks to earn that job for the 2008 season. The other outside spot is up in the air, with Nevin McKenzie seeing the most time there the previous year.

Defensive backsThe defensive backfield saw a slew of injuries and changes in 2007, but looks to be much more stable and seasoned in 2008. The Vols must replace departing safety Jonathan Hefney. Sophomores Eric Berry (SS), Brent Vinson and DeAngelo Willingham (Cornerbacks) should return to their spots with special teams phenom, Dennis Rogan expected to see plenty of snaps at both cornerback and safety. SS Demetrice Morley was reinstated in school after academic trouble caused him to miss the 2007 season. He is the leading candidate at the vacant free safety spot. It has also been stated during the off season that Eric Berry could see time on the offensive side of the ball, as he has lined up at quarterback multiple times during spring practice.

Projected starters (Note: Does not include incoming freshmen).

 * – Denotes returning starter
 ↑ – Denotes number of games started by the player at the listed position during the 2008 season.

Special teams
Position outlookSophomore Daniel Lincoln (kicker) replaced departing Senior James Wilhoit in 2007 and earned All American Honors.  Britton Colquitt returns as punter and will handle kickoffs. Sophomores Dennis Rogan emerged as the main kick and punt returner last, with Lennon Creer joining him as kick returner. Both players return.

Projected starters (Note: Does not include incoming Freshmen).

 * – Denotes returning starter
 ↑ – Denotes number of games started by the player at the listed position during the 2008 season.
 ‡ – Note: Cunningham will be the starter during Colquitt's suspension.

Rankings

Team players drafted into the NFL

Reference:

References

Tennessee
Tennessee Volunteers football seasons
Tennessee Volunteers football